Elkin Municipal Airport  is a public airport in Surry County, North Carolina, United States, three miles northeast of Elkin. It is owned by the Town of Elkin; the National Plan of Integrated Airport Systems for 2011–2015 called it a general aviation facility.

Most U.S. airports use the same three-letter location identifier for the FAA and IATA, but Elkin is assigned ZEF by the FAA and has no IATA identifier. The airport's ICAO identifier is KZEF.

Facilities and aircraft 
Elkin Municipal Airport covers 91 acres (37 ha) at an elevation of 1,067 feet (325 m) above mean sea level. Its one runway, 7/25, is 4,001 by 75 feet (1,220 x 23 m) asphalt.

In the year ending July 24, 2009 the airport had 13,350 aircraft operations, average 36 per day: 97% general aviation and 3% military. 17 aircraft were then based at this airport: 88% single-engine and 12% multi-engine.

References

External links 
  at North Carolina DOT airport guide
 Aerial image as of March 1998 from USGS The National Map
 
 

Airports in North Carolina
Transportation in Surry County, North Carolina
Buildings and structures in Surry County, North Carolina